Piyush Mishra (born as Priyakant Sharma; 13 January 1963) is an Indian actor, singer, lyricist, playwright, musician and screenwriter.

Mishra grew up in Gwalior, and graduated from National School of Drama, Delhi in 1986. Thereafter, he started his career in Hindi theatre in Delhi. Over the next decade, he established himself as a theatre director, actor, lyricist and singer. He moved to Mumbai in 2002, receiving acclaim for his acting in Maqbool (2003) and Gangs of Wasseypur (2012).

As a film lyricist and singer, he is noted for his songs Arre Ruk Ja Re Bandeh in Black Friday, (2004), Aarambh Hai Prachand in Gulaal (2009), Ik Bagal in Gangs of Wasseypur - Part 1, (2012), and Husna in MTV Coke Studio, (2012).

Early life and background
Mishra was born on 13 January 1963 in a Brahmin family in Gwalior to Pratap Kumar Sharma. He grew up as Priyakant Sharma and was adopted by his father's eldest sister Taradevi Mishra, who had no children. Later, his family moved into his aunt's house to ease financial burden. His parents admitted him to Carmel Convent School, Gwalior thinking that his education in a convent will help him excel in academics but it was activities like singing, painting and acting which appealed to him. Piyush later moved to Gwalior's JC Mills Higher Secondary School. However, living in the authoritative household of his aunt, developed a rebellious streak in him, which showed up in his first poem, Zinda ho haan tum koi shak nahin (Yes you are alive; of this there is no doubt), he wrote in class 8th. Later, while studying in class 10, he even filed an affidavit in the district court and changed his name to one his choice to Piyush Mishra.

Around this time, he began to be drawn to theatre – it was at places like Kala Mandir and Rangshri Little Ballet Troupe in Gwalior that his talent for the medium was first identified. In spite of the appreciation he was beginning to receive in the theatre circles, his family kept insisting he concentrate on his studies. He took the entrance test to the National School of Drama, New Delhi in 1983, not with any particular desire to study but to get out of Gwalior. Thereafter he moved to Delhi, and joined National School of Drama, graduating in 1986. While at NSD, he got a chance to compose his first music score for a student play, Mashreeki Hoor. His acting breakthrough came in his second year at NSD, when German director, Fritz Bennewitz (1926–95), directed him in the title role in Hamlet and introduced him to acting technique.

Career

Theater and television
After his graduation from NSD in 1986, Piyush Mishra started his career as a theatre actor in Delhi, and in 1990, helped start the theatre group Act One, with founder-director N. K. Sharma and stage actors like Manoj Bajpai, Gajraj Rao and Ashish Vidyarthi. In the following years he wrote and directed several plays as a part of Act One Theatre Group, including the acclaimed play, Gagan Damama Bajiyo (The Sky Resounds with the Call to Arms), based on revolutionary Bhagat Singh, which was first performed in 1994, and upon publishing, sold its first edition in just seven days. In 1996 he joined Asmita Theatre Group, and performed his popular one-man shows An Evening with Piyush Mishra. He wrote the lyrics for Asmita's popular plays. Piyush acted as Maniac in operation three star (an adaptation of Dario Fo's play Accidental Death of an Anarchist). Piyush is also known for his performance in Swadesh Deepak's Court Martial as Suraj Singh, first with Ranjeet Kapoor (1991) and later under the direction of Arvind Gaur (1996).

By then, he had established himself as a theatre director and directed Comedy of Terror play for Shriram Centre Repertory Company, and also presented his solo act play at the National School of Drama's Annual Theatre Festival, Bharat Rang Mahotsav in 1999. Mishra briefly moved to Mumbai, as he acted in a television series, Rajdhani (1989), directed by Tigmanshu Dhulia for Star TV, and Shyam Benegal's Bharat Ek Khoj (1988) and horror TV serial Kile ka Rahasya (1989), though he returned to Delhi thereafter.

Films
Mishra made his debut as a film actor with Mani Ratnam's Dil Se.. in 1998, he portrayed as C.B.I Investigation Officer. though he continued to stay in Delhi to pursue theatre. His transition from playwright to screenwriter happened when he wrote the dialogues for Rajkumar Santoshi's 2001 film The Legend of Bhagat Singh, which was inspired in part by Mishra's critically acclaimed play on Bhagat Singh – Gagan Damama Bajyo. It won him the Zee Cine Award for Best Dialogue (2003). Meanwhile, he moved to Mumbai in November 2002, where he went on to establish a career as a film lyricist, screenwriter and as an actor. He started writing lyrics with the film, Dil Pe Mat Le Yaar in 2002, and subsequently wrote for Black Friday (2004), Aaja Nachle and Tashan.

Mishra won accolades for his performance as Kaka in Vishal Bhardwaj's 2003 film Maqbool, an adaptation of William Shakespeare's Macbeth. He wrote his own dialogues for his performance as Hafeez (Huffy) Bhai in Jhoom Barabar Jhoom (2007), and delivered them in poetry style.

Mishra again appeared in Anurag Kashyap's 2009 movie Gulaal, a movie based on Indian youth, politics, caste-prejudice, and other such social topics. He played Prithvi, the poet brother of Dukey Bana (played by Kay Kay Menon), in the movie. This was a role he executed with aplomb. He also wrote the lyrics for the songs in the movie, and sung few of them as well and was also the music director of the film. He has acted in Rockstar alongside Ranbir Kapoor and was known as the 'Image is everything...everything is Image' guy. He acted and wrote lyrics of some songs for the movie Gangs of Wasseypur. His songs are very high on poetic content and have received critical appreciation from all sections of audiences and critics.

In 2014, he acted in the film The Shaukeens, along with Anupam Kher, Annu Kapoor, Lisa Haydon in the lead role, which had Akshay Kumar in an extended cameo. Piyush also appeared in The Kapil Sharma Show to promote the film with Anupam Kher and Annu Kapoor. Although the film was a remake of the 1982 film  Shaukeen directed by Basu Chatterjee, it was well appreciated by audience and was voted the best comedy film of 2014.

Personal life
He married Priya Narayanan in 1995, whom he met in 1992 while directing a play at the School of Planning and Architecture. He lives in Goregaon East, Mumbai with his wife, who is an architect and two sons Josh who is studying at Institute of Hotel Management, Catering Technology and Applied Nutrition, Mumbai and Jai.

Discography

Songwriting credits

Singer
 "Aarambh Hai Prachand" (Gulaal - 2009)
 "Duniya" (Gulaal - 2009)
 "Jab Sheher Hamara" (Gulaal - 2009)
 "Ik Bagal" (Gangs of Wasseypur - Part 1 – 2012)
 "Ik Bagal" (Gangs of Wasseypur - Part 2 – 2012)
 "Aabroo" (Gangs of Wasseypur - Part 2 – 2012)
 "Manva" (Arjun: The Warrior Prince - 2012)
 "Bargat Ke Pedo Pe Shakhe Purani"  (Jalpari: The Desert Mermaid – 2012)
 "Bas Chal Kapat"  (Saheb, Biwi Aur Gangster Returns – 2013)
"Chanda Ki Katori Hai (Lorie)" (Revolver Rani - 2014)
"Chal Lade Re Bhaiya" (Revolver Rani - 2014)
"Thaayein Kare Katta" (Revolver Rani - 2014)
 "Jigarwala Sirf Woh" (Ala Vaikunthapurramuloo (Hindi dubbed) - 2022)

Composer
 Gulaal (2009)
 Lahore (2010) (Song: "Oh Re Bande")
 Gangs of Wasseypur (2012) (Songs: "Manmauji" & "Ik Bagal")
 Gangs of Wasseypur - Part 2 (2012) (Song: "Ik Bagal")
 Jalpari: The Desert Mermaid  (2012) (Song: "Bargat Ke Pedo")

Other
 Husna Coke Studio (India) Season 2 (2012 - Composer/Singer/Lyrics/Performer)
 O Re Manvaa (My Heart) (2012 - Composer/Singer/Lyrics)
 Tom Dick and Harry (The Dewarists) together with Akala (Composer/Singer/Lyrics)
 Ghar Coke Studio (India) Season 3 (2013 - Composer/Singer/Lyrics/Performer)
 Reunion (Google India Google Search Advertisement) (2013 - Singer)
 Parle-G New Ad: Roko Mat Toko Mat (2013 - Composer/Singer/Lyrics)

Filmography

Actor

Theatre Work

Screenplay and dialogues
 The Legend of Bhagat Singh (2002) – Dialogues
 Yahaan (2005) – Screenplay and dialogues
 1971 (2007) – Screenplay
 Ghajini (2008) – Dialogues
 Lahore (2010) – Screenplay
 Chittagong (2011) – Dialogues
 Agneepath (2012) – Dialogues
 Shamshera (2022) - Dialogues 
 Mandi House - Screenplay and dialogues (Post Production)
 Yo Jawaan Yo Kisaan - Dialogues (Post Production)

Awards
Zee Cine Awards
 2003: Best Dialogue: The Legend of Bhagat Singh (with Ranjit Kapoor and Rajkumar Santoshi)

Stardust Awards
 2010: Standout Performance by a Music Director: Gulaal

References

External links 

 
 

 An Interview with Piyush Mishra

1963 births
Living people
Indian male film actors
Male actors in Hindi cinema
Indian male stage actors
National School of Drama alumni
Hindi-language lyricists
Indian male screenwriters
People from Gwalior
Hindi theatre
Indian male playback singers
Bollywood playback singers
Indian male singer-songwriters
Indian singer-songwriters
Singers from Madhya Pradesh
Screenwriters from Madhya Pradesh
Male actors from Madhya Pradesh
20th-century Indian male actors
21st-century Indian male actors
Male actors in Marathi cinema
Indian male television actors
Male actors in Telugu cinema
Male actors in Tamil cinema